This is a list of songs known to have been written by award-winning American singer-songwriter Don Williams.

Songs 
List of songs written by Williams in chronological order, with first known release and year

References 

Williams, Don